Albany Municipal Airport  is a general aviation airport located  east of the city of Albany in Linn County, Oregon, United States. It is publicly owned and operated by the City of Albany. It is the oldest known operating airfield in Oregon, having opened in 1920.

There are 58 aircraft based at the municipal airport; 49 single engine airplanes, 7 multi-engine, and 2 jet airplanes. On average there are 62 aircraft operations per day.

History
 The airport was first opened to the public in 1920 by private owners.
 In 1929 the City of Albany bought the property and named it the Albany Municipal Airport.
 A 1931 airshow inspired the Northwest Art and Air Festival.
 A jet first landed in Albany in 1964.
 In 1998, Albany Municipal Airport became the first airport in Oregon to be listed on the National Register of Historic Places (as the Albany Municipal Airport Historic District).

Cargo service
 Ameriflight (Portland)
 FedEx Express
 FedEx Feeder operated by Empire Airlines (Portland)

See also
 Albany Airport (disambiguation)

References

External links 

 Albany Municipal Airport at City of Albany website
 

Buildings and structures in Albany, Oregon
Airports in Linn County, Oregon
National Register of Historic Places in Linn County, Oregon
1920 establishments in Oregon